is a Japanese handball player for Puente Genil and the Japanese national team.

He participated at the 2017 World Men's Handball Championship.

References

1985 births
Living people
Japanese male handball players
Expatriate handball players
Japanese expatriates in Spain
Liga ASOBAL players
Sportspeople from Okinawa Prefecture